Aziz Jindani is a Pakistani film director, screenwriter, producer, and a computer graphics artist.  He was also involved in making Commander Safeguard as a Brand Manager, Global franchise of Procter & Gamble, United States.

Career

In 2005, he worked on the first season of Commander Safeguard as a director and head of production. The TV show garnered many accolades. This cartoon was famous among kids. This cartoon spread the message to stay neat & clean all the time. This cartoon was a promotional cartoon by Safeguard Soap.

In 2016, Aziz founded Talisman Studios, an animation studio based in Karachi and began work on his first feature film. His film, The Donkey King, was released nationwide on 13 October 2018 to positive reviews and broke the first week record for an animated film at the Pakistani box office. It went on to become the highest-grossing animated film in Pakistan's history.

Filmography

Film

As director

Television

As director

References

External links
 

Living people
Year of birth missing (living people)
Urdu film producers
Film directors from Karachi
Pakistani television directors
Sindhi people
Pakistani animated film directors
Pakistani animated film producers